Carlinville station is a train station in Carlinville, Illinois, United States served by Amtrak, the national railroad passenger system. Amtrak service is provided by Lincoln Service and the Texas Eagle. This was also a stop for the Ann Rutledge until April 2007. It is a flag stop on the Texas Eagle; the train will stop there only if there are passengers to board or alight there. It is a regular stop on the Lincoln Service.

Construction of a new upgraded station was completed in the fall of 2017.

References

External links

Carlinville Amtrak station information

Carlinville Amtrak Station (USA Rail Guide -- Train Web)

Amtrak stations in Illinois
Transportation buildings and structures in Macoupin County, Illinois
Railway stations in the United States opened in 2017